Juan Alexander Campos Hernández (born May 8, 1980) is a Salvadoran professional football player.

Club career

Águila
Nicknamed El Murciélago (the Bat), Campos started his career at Tercera División club Los Andes, then had a spell at Jocoro, before making his Primera División debut for Águila in 2003. He immediately became the league top scorer with 13 goals in his first season.

One of his most important moments with the team of San Miguel came during the Clausura 2006 final against FAS, in that game Campos scored a goal against the Santa Ana team, helping Águila to win his 14th title, under the coaching of Serbian Vladan Vićević.

With Águila he also lost the final of the Apertura 2003.

Alianza
He joined Alianza in 2008, only to leave them for Luis Ángel Firpo after inexplicably failing to turn up for training with Alianza.

Luis Ángel Firpo
Campos signed with Luis Ángel Firpo for the Apertura 2009, reaching the semi-finals of that tournament, before being eliminated 0–3 by Águila on aggregate.

Atlético Balboa
In 2010, he signed with Atlético Balboa. With the team of La Unión, Campos became the top scorer of the Apertura 2010 with 9 goals, beating other scorers like Rodolfo Zelaya and Anel Canales.

Once Municipal
In the Apertura 2011, Campos signed with Once Municipal. With the team of Ahuachapán reached the final of that tournament, but they were defeated by Isidro Metapán. Campos played the final as substitute.

UES
He signed with UES for the Apertura 2012.

Juventud Independiente
Campos signed with Juventud Independiente for the Clausura 2013.

Dragón
In December 2013, he signed with Dragón.

Topiltzín
In 2014, he signed with Topiltzín.

Pasaquina
Campos signed with Pasaquina for the Clausura 2015. Later, at the Apertura 2015, Campos played 11 games and could not finish his contract for a year with Pasaquina after being fired by the directive. However, Campos filed a lawsuit.

Return to Dragón
Before starting the Clausura 2016, Campos played with Dragón some friendly matches during the pre-season.

Return to Luis Ángel Firpo
In 2016, he joined to Luis Ángel Firpo of Segunda División.

Return to Pasaquina
Campos played with Pasaquina for the Apertura 2016. He scored the only goal in a 1–0 victory against Municipal Limeño at the Estadio San Sebastián.

Jocoro
In 2017, Campos signed with Jocoro.

International career
Campos made his debut for El Salvador national team in a February 2003 UNCAF Nations Cup match against Panama and has earned a total of 23 caps, scoring no goals. He has represented his country in only 1 FIFA World Cup qualification match and played at the 2003 and 2005 UNCAF Nations Cups and at the 2003 and 2007 CONCACAF Gold Cups.

His final international game was a June 2007 CONCACAF Gold Cup match against the United States.

References

External links
 Alexander Campos at Soccerway 

1980 births
Living people
People from San Miguel Department (El Salvador)
Association football forwards
Salvadoran footballers
El Salvador international footballers
2003 UNCAF Nations Cup players
2003 CONCACAF Gold Cup players
2005 UNCAF Nations Cup players
2007 CONCACAF Gold Cup players
C.D. Águila footballers
Alianza F.C. footballers
C.D. Luis Ángel Firpo footballers
Atlético Balboa footballers
Once Municipal footballers